In mathematics, specifically category theory, adjunction is a relationship that two functors may exhibit, intuitively corresponding to a weak form of equivalence between two related categories. Two functors that stand in this relationship are known as adjoint functors, one being the left adjoint and the other the right adjoint. Pairs of adjoint functors are ubiquitous in mathematics and often arise from constructions of "optimal solutions" to certain problems (i.e., constructions of objects having a certain universal property), such as the construction of a free group on a set in algebra, or the construction of the Stone–Čech compactification of a topological space in topology.

   and   

In many situations, an adjunction can be "upgraded" to an equivalence, by a suitable natural modification of the involved categories  and functors.

Terminology and notation 

The terms adjoint and adjunct are both used, and are cognates: one is taken directly from Latin, the other from Latin via French.  In the classic text Categories for the working mathematician, Mac Lane makes a distinction between the two. Given a family

 

In general, the phrases " is a left adjoint" and " has a right adjoint" are equivalent.

If F is left adjoint to G, we also write

The analogy to adjoint maps of Hilbert spaces can be made precise in certain contexts.

Introduction and Motivation 

Common mathematical constructions are very often adjoint functors.  Consequently, general theorems about left/right adjoint functors encode the details of many useful and otherwise non-trivial results. Such general theorems include the equivalence of the various definitions of adjoint functors, the uniqueness of a right adjoint for a given left adjoint, the fact that left/right adjoint functors respectively preserve colimits/limits (which are also found in every area of mathematics), and the general adjoint functor theorems giving conditions under which a given functor is a left/right adjoint.

Solutions to optimization problems 
In a sense, an adjoint functor is a way of giving the most efficient solution to some problem via a method which is formulaic.  For example, an elementary problem in ring theory is how to turn a rng (which is like a ring that might not have a multiplicative identity) into a ring.  The most efficient way is to adjoin an element '1' to the rng, adjoin all (and only) the elements which are necessary for satisfying the ring axioms (e.g. r+1 for each r in the ring), and impose no relations in the newly formed ring that are not forced by axioms.  Moreover, this construction is formulaic in the sense that it works in essentially the same way for any rng.

This is rather vague, though suggestive, and can be made precise in the language of category theory: a construction is most efficient if it satisfies a universal property, and is formulaic if it defines a functor.  Universal properties come in two types: initial properties and terminal properties.  Since these are dual notions, it is only necessary to discuss one of them.

The idea of using an initial property is to set up the problem in terms of some auxiliary category E, so that the problem at hand corresponds to finding an initial object of E.  This has an advantage that the optimization—the sense that the process finds the most efficient solution—means something rigorous and recognisable, rather like the attainment of a supremum.  The category E is also formulaic in this construction, since it is always the category of elements of the functor to which one is constructing an adjoint.

Back to our example: take the given rng R, and make a category E whose objects are rng homomorphisms R → S, with S a ring having a multiplicative identity. The morphisms in E between R → S1 and R → S2 are commutative triangles of the form (R → S1, R → S2, S1 → S2) where S1 → S2 is a ring map (which preserves the identity). (Note that this is precisely the definition of the comma category of R over the inclusion of unitary rings into rng.) The existence of a morphism between R → S1 and R → S2 implies that S1 is at least as efficient a solution as S2 to our problem: S2 can have more adjoined elements and/or more relations not imposed by axioms than S1.
Therefore, the assertion that an object R → R* is initial in E, that is, that there is a morphism from it to any other element of E, means that the ring R* is a most efficient solution to our problem.

The two facts that this method of turning rngs into rings is most efficient and formulaic can be expressed simultaneously by saying that it defines an adjoint functor. More explicitly:  Let F denote the above process of adjoining an identity to a rng, so F(R)=R*.  Let G denote the process of “forgetting″ whether a ring S has an identity and considering it simply as a rng, so essentially G(S)=S. Then F is the left adjoint functor of G.

Note however that we haven't actually constructed R* yet; it is an important and not altogether trivial algebraic fact that such a left adjoint functor R → R* actually exists.

Symmetry of optimization problems

It is also possible to start with the functor F, and pose the following (vague) question: is there a problem to which F is the most efficient solution?

The notion that F is the most efficient solution to the problem posed by G is, in a certain rigorous sense, equivalent to the notion that G poses the most difficult problem that F solves.

This gives the intuition behind the fact that adjoint functors occur in pairs: if F is left adjoint to G, then G is right adjoint to F.

Formal definitions

There are various equivalent definitions for adjoint functors:

 The definitions via universal morphisms are easy to state, and require minimal verifications when constructing an adjoint functor or proving two functors are adjoint.  They are also the most analogous to our intuition involving optimizations.
 The definition via hom-sets makes symmetry the most apparent, and is the reason for using the word adjoint.
 The definition via counit–unit adjunction is convenient for proofs about functors which are known to be adjoint, because they provide formulas that can be directly manipulated.

The equivalency of these definitions is quite useful. Adjoint functors arise everywhere, in all areas of mathematics.  Since the structure in any of these definitions gives rise to the structures in the others, switching between them makes implicit use of many details that would otherwise have to be repeated separately in every subject area.

Conventions

The theory of adjoints has the terms left and right at its foundation, and there are many components which live in one of two categories C and D which are under consideration.  Therefore it can be helpful to choose letters in alphabetical order according to whether they live in the "lefthand" category C or the "righthand" category D, and also to write them down in this order whenever possible.

In this article for example, the letters X, F, f, ε will consistently denote things which live in the category C, the letters Y, G, g, η will consistently denote things which live in the category D, and whenever possible such things will be referred to in order from left to right (a functor F : D → C can be thought of as "living" where its outputs are, in C).

Definition via universal morphisms

By definition, a functor 
 is a left adjoint functor if for each object  in  there exists a universal morphism 
Spelled out, this means that for each object  in  there exists an object 

The latter equation is expressed by the following commutative diagram:

In this situation, one can show that  can be turned into a functor  in a unique way such that 
 

Similarly, we may define right-adjoint functors.

These definitions via universal morphisms are often useful for establishing that a given functor is left or right adjoint, because they are minimalistic in their requirements. They are also intuitively meaningful in that finding a universal morphism is like solving an optimization problem.

Definition via Hom-set adjunction

.
This specifies a family of bijections

for all objects X in C and Y in D.

In this situation,  F is left adjoint to G  and  G is right adjoint to F .

This definition is a logical compromise in that it is more difficult to satisfy than the universal morphism definitions, and has fewer immediate implications than the counit–unit definition.  It is useful because of its obvious symmetry, and as a stepping-stone between the other definitions.

For details, see the article on hom functors. Explicitly, the naturality of Φ means that for all morphisms  in C and all morphisms  in D the following diagram commutes:

The vertical arrows in this diagram are those induced by composition. Formally, Hom(Fg, f) : HomC(FY, X) → HomC(FY′, X′) is given by h → f o h o Fg for each h in HomC(FY, X). Hom(g, Gf) is similar.

Definition via counit–unit adjunction

A counit–unit adjunction between two categories C and D consists of two functors F : D → C and G : C → D and two natural transformations

respectively called the counit and the unit of the adjunction (terminology from universal algebra), such that the compositions

are the identity transformations 1F and 1G on F and G respectively.

In this situation we say that  F is left adjoint to G  and  G is right adjoint to F , and may indicate this relationship by writing   , or simply   .

In equation form, the above conditions on (ε,η) are the counit–unit equations

which mean that for each X in C and each Y in D,
.

Note that  denotes the identify functor on the category ,  denotes the identity natural transformation from the functor F to itself, and  denotes the identity morphism of the object FY.

These equations are useful in reducing proofs about adjoint functors to algebraic manipulations.  They are sometimes called the triangle identities, or sometimes the zig-zag equations because of the appearance of the corresponding string diagrams.  A way to remember them is to first write down the nonsensical equation  and then fill in either F or G in one of the two simple ways which make the compositions defined.

Note: The use of the prefix "co" in counit here is not consistent with the terminology of limits and colimits, because a colimit satisfies an initial property whereas the counit morphisms will satisfy terminal properties, and dually.  The term unit here is borrowed from the theory of monads where it looks like the insertion of the identity 1 into a monoid.

History

The idea of adjoint functors was introduced by Daniel Kan in 1958.  Like many of the concepts in category theory, it was suggested by the needs of homological algebra, which was at the time devoted to computations. Those faced with giving tidy, systematic presentations of the subject would have noticed relations such as

hom(F(X), Y) = hom(X, G(Y))

in the category of abelian groups, where F was the functor  (i.e. take the tensor product with A), and G was the functor hom(A,–) (this is now known as the tensor-hom adjunction).

The use of the equals sign is an abuse of notation; those two groups are not really identical but there is a way of identifying them that is natural. It can be seen to be natural on the basis, firstly, that these are two alternative descriptions of the bilinear mappings from X × A to Y. That is, however, something particular to the case of tensor product. In category theory the 'naturality' of the bijection is subsumed in the concept of a natural isomorphism.

Ubiquity
If one starts looking for these adjoint pairs of functors, they turn out to be very common in abstract algebra, and elsewhere as well. The example section below provides evidence of this; furthermore, universal constructions, which may be more familiar to some, give rise to numerous adjoint pairs of functors.

In accordance with the thinking of Saunders Mac Lane, any idea, such as adjoint functors, that occurs widely enough in mathematics should be studied for its own sake.

Concepts can be judged according to their use in solving problems, as well as for their use in building theories. The tension between these two motivations was especially great during the 1950s when category theory was initially developed. Enter Alexander Grothendieck, who used category theory to take compass bearings in other work—in functional analysis, homological algebra and finally algebraic geometry.

It is probably wrong to say that he promoted the adjoint functor concept in isolation: but recognition of the role of adjunction was inherent  in Grothendieck's approach. For example, one of his major achievements was the formulation of Serre duality in relative form—loosely, in a continuous family of algebraic varieties. The entire proof turned on the existence of a right adjoint to a certain functor. This is something undeniably abstract, and non-constructive, but also powerful in its own way.

Examples

Free groups
The construction of free groups is a common and illuminating example.

Let F : Set → Grp be the functor assigning to each set Y the free group generated by the elements of Y, and let G : Grp → Set be the forgetful functor, which assigns to each group X its underlying set.  Then F is left adjoint to G:

Initial morphisms.  For each set Y, the set GFY is just the underlying set of the free group FY generated by Y.  Let    be the set map given by "inclusion of generators".  This is an initial morphism from Y to G, because any set map from Y to the underlying set GW of some group W will factor through    via a unique group homomorphism from FY to W.  This is precisely the universal property of the free group on Y.

Terminal morphisms.  For each group X, the group FGX is the free group generated freely by GX, the elements of X. Let    be the group homomorphism which sends the generators of FGX to the elements of X they correspond to, which exists by the universal property of free groups. Then each    is a terminal morphism from F to X, because any group homomorphism from a free group FZ to X will factor through    via a unique set map from Z to GX.  This means that (F,G) is an adjoint pair.

Hom-set adjunction.  Group homomorphisms from the free group FY to a group X correspond precisely to maps from the set Y to the set GX: each homomorphism from FY to X is fully determined by its action on generators, another restatement of the universal property of free groups.  One can verify directly that this correspondence is a natural transformation, which means it is a hom-set adjunction for the pair (F,G).

counit–unit adjunction. One can also verify directly that ε and η are natural.  Then, a direct verification that they form a counit–unit adjunction    is as follows:

The first counit–unit equation    says that for each set Y the composition

should be the identity.  The intermediate group FGFY is the free group generated freely by the words of the free group FY.  (Think of these words as placed in parentheses to indicate that they are independent generators.)  The arrow    is the group homomorphism from FY into FGFY sending each generator y of FY to the corresponding word of length one (y) as a generator of FGFY.  The arrow    is the group homomorphism from FGFY to FY sending each generator to the word of FY it corresponds to (so this map is "dropping parentheses").  The composition of these maps is indeed the identity on FY.

The second counit–unit equation    says that for each group X the composition
  
should be the identity.  The intermediate set GFGX is just the underlying set of FGX.  The arrow    is the "inclusion of generators" set map from the set GX to the set GFGX.  The arrow    is the set map from GFGX to GX which underlies the group homomorphism sending each generator of FGX to the element of X it corresponds to ("dropping parentheses").  The composition of these maps is indeed the identity on GX.

Free constructions and forgetful functors
Free objects are all examples of a left adjoint to a forgetful functor which assigns to an algebraic object its underlying set.  These algebraic free functors have generally the same description as in the detailed description of the free group situation above.

Diagonal functors and limits
Products, fibred products, equalizers, and kernels are all examples of the categorical notion of a limit.  Any limit functor is right adjoint to a corresponding diagonal functor (provided the category has the type of limits in question), and the counit of the adjunction provides the defining maps from the limit object (i.e. from the diagonal functor on the limit, in the functor category).  Below are some specific examples.

 Products Let Π : Grp2 → Grp the functor which assigns to each pair (X1, X2) the product group X1×X2, and let Δ : Grp → Grp2  be the diagonal functor which assigns to every group X the pair (X, X) in the product category Grp2. The universal property of the product group shows that Π is right-adjoint to Δ.  The counit of this adjunction is the defining pair of projection maps from X1×X2 to X1 and X2 which define the limit, and the unit is the diagonal inclusion of a group X into X×X (mapping x to (x,x)).

 The cartesian product of sets, the product of rings, the product of topological spaces etc. follow the same pattern; it can also be extended in a straightforward manner to more than just two factors.  More generally, any type of limit is right adjoint to a diagonal functor.

 Kernels. Consider the category D of homomorphisms of abelian groups. If f1 : A1 → B1 and f2 : A2 → B2 are two objects of D, then a morphism from f1 to f2 is a pair (gA, gB) of morphisms such that gBf1 = f2gA. Let G : D → Ab be the functor which assigns to each homomorphism its kernel and let F : Ab → D  be the functor which maps the group A to the homomorphism A → 0. Then G is right adjoint to F, which expresses the universal property of kernels.  The counit of this adjunction is the defining embedding of a homomorphism's kernel into the homomorphism's domain, and the unit is the morphism identifying a group A with the kernel of the homomorphism A → 0.

 A suitable variation of this example also shows that the kernel functors for vector spaces and for modules are right adjoints. Analogously, one can show that the cokernel functors for abelian groups, vector spaces and modules are left adjoints.

Colimits and diagonal functors
Coproducts, fibred coproducts, coequalizers, and cokernels are all examples of the categorical notion of a colimit.  Any colimit functor is left adjoint to a corresponding diagonal functor (provided the category has the type of colimits in question), and the unit of the adjunction provides the defining maps into the colimit object.  Below are some specific examples.

 Coproducts. If F :  Ab2 → Ab assigns to every pair (X1, X2) of abelian groups their direct sum, and if G : Ab → Ab2 is the functor which assigns to every abelian group Y the pair (Y, Y), then F is left adjoint to G, again a consequence of the universal property of direct sums.  The unit of this adjoint pair is the defining pair of inclusion maps from X1 and X2 into the direct sum, and the counit is the additive map from the direct sum of (X,X) to back to X (sending an element (a,b) of the direct sum to the element a+b of X).

 Analogous examples are given by the direct sum of vector spaces and modules, by the free product of groups and by the disjoint union of sets.

Further examples

Algebra 
 Adjoining an identity to a rng.  This example was discussed in the motivation section above.  Given a rng R, a multiplicative identity element can be added by taking RxZ and defining a Z-bilinear product with (r,0)(0,1) = (0,1)(r,0) = (r,0), (r,0)(s,0) = (rs,0), (0,1)(0,1) = (0,1). This constructs a left adjoint to the functor taking a ring to the underlying rng.
 Adjoining an identity to a semigroup. Similarly, given a semigroup S, we can add an identity element and obtain a monoid by taking the disjoint union S  {1} and defining a binary operation on it such that it extends the operation on S and 1 is an identity element. This construction gives a functor that is  a left adjoint to the functor taking a monoid to the underlying semigroup.
 Ring extensions. Suppose R and S are rings, and ρ : R → S is a ring homomorphism. Then S can be seen as a (left) R-module, and the tensor product with S yields a functor F : R-Mod → S-Mod. Then F is left adjoint to the forgetful functor G : S-Mod → R-Mod.
 Tensor products. If R is a ring and M is a right R-module, then the tensor product with M yields a functor F : R-Mod → Ab. The functor G : Ab → R-Mod, defined by G(A) = homZ(M,A) for every abelian group A, is a right adjoint to F.
 From monoids and groups to rings. The integral monoid ring construction gives a functor from monoids to rings. This functor is left adjoint to the functor that associates to a given ring its underlying multiplicative monoid. Similarly, the integral group ring construction yields a functor from groups to rings, left adjoint to the functor that assigns to a given ring its group of units. One can also start with a field K and consider the category of K-algebras instead of the category of rings, to get the monoid and group rings over K.
 Field of fractions. Consider the category Domm of integral domains with injective morphisms. The forgetful functor Field → Domm from fields has a left adjoint—it assigns to every integral domain its field of fractions.
 Polynomial rings. Let Ring* be the category of pointed commutative rings with unity (pairs (A,a) where A is a ring, a ∈ A and morphisms preserve the distinguished elements). The forgetful functor G:Ring* → Ring has a left adjoint – it assigns to every ring R the pair (R[x],x) where R[x] is the polynomial ring with coefficients from R.
 Abelianization. Consider the inclusion functor G : Ab → Grp from the category of abelian groups to category of groups. It has a left adjoint called abelianization which assigns to every group G the quotient group Gab=G/[G,G].
 The Grothendieck group. In K-theory, the point of departure is to observe that the category of vector bundles on a topological space has a commutative monoid structure under direct sum. One may make an abelian group out of this monoid, the Grothendieck group, by formally adding an additive inverse for each bundle (or equivalence class). Alternatively one can observe that the functor that for each group takes the underlying monoid (ignoring inverses) has a left adjoint. This is a once-for-all construction, in line with the third section discussion above. That is, one can imitate the construction of negative numbers; but there is the other option of an existence theorem. For the case of finitary algebraic structures, the existence by itself can be referred to universal algebra, or model theory; naturally there is also a proof adapted to category theory, too.
 Frobenius reciprocity in the representation theory of groups: see induced representation. This example foreshadowed the general theory by about half a century.

Topology
 A functor with a left and a right adjoint. Let G be the functor from topological spaces to sets that associates to every topological space its underlying set (forgetting the topology, that is). G has a left adjoint F, creating the discrete space on a set Y, and a right adjoint H creating the trivial topology on Y.
 Suspensions and loop spaces.  Given topological spaces X and Y, the space [SX, Y] of homotopy classes of maps from the suspension SX of X to Y is naturally isomorphic to the space [X, ΩY] of homotopy classes of maps from X to the loop space ΩY of Y.  The suspension functor is therefore left adjoint to the loop space functor in the homotopy category, an important fact in homotopy theory.
 Stone–Čech compactification. Let KHaus be the category of compact Hausdorff spaces and G : KHaus → Top be the inclusion functor to the category of topological spaces. Then G has a left adjoint F : Top → KHaus, the Stone–Čech compactification. The unit of this adjoint pair yields a continuous map from every topological space X into its Stone–Čech compactification. 
 Direct and inverse images of sheaves. Every continuous map f : X → Y between topological spaces induces a functor f ∗ from the category of sheaves (of sets, or abelian groups, or rings...) on X to the corresponding category of sheaves on Y, the direct image functor. It also induces a functor f −1 from the category of sheaves of abelian groups on Y to the category of sheaves of abelian groups on X, the inverse image functor. f −1 is left adjoint to f ∗. Here a more subtle point is that the left adjoint for coherent sheaves will differ from that for sheaves (of sets).
 Soberification. The article on Stone duality describes an adjunction between the category of topological spaces and the category of sober spaces that is known as soberification. Notably, the article also contains a detailed description of another adjunction that prepares the way for the famous duality of sober spaces and spatial locales, exploited in pointless topology.

Posets
Every partially ordered set can be viewed as a category (where the elements of the poset become the category's objects and we have a single morphism from x to y if and only if x ≤ y). A pair of adjoint functors between two partially ordered sets is called a Galois connection (or, if it is contravariant, an antitone Galois connection). See that article for a number of examples: the case of Galois theory of course is a leading one. Any Galois connection gives rise to closure operators and to inverse order-preserving bijections between the corresponding closed elements.

As is the case for Galois groups, the real interest lies often in refining a correspondence to a duality (i.e. antitone order isomorphism). A treatment of Galois theory along these lines by Kaplansky was influential in the recognition of the general structure here.

The partial order case collapses the adjunction definitions quite noticeably, but can provide several themes:
 adjunctions may not be dualities or isomorphisms, but are candidates for upgrading to that status
 closure operators may indicate the presence of adjunctions, as corresponding monads (cf. the Kuratowski closure axioms)
 a very general comment of William Lawvere is that syntax and semantics are adjoint: take C to be the set of all logical theories (axiomatizations), and D the power set of the set of all mathematical structures. For a theory T in C, let G(T) be the set of all structures that satisfy the axioms T; for a set of mathematical structures S, let F(S) be the minimal axiomatization of S. We can then say that S is a subset of G(T) if and only if F(S) logically implies T: the "semantics functor" G is right adjoint to the "syntax functor" F.
 division is (in general) the attempt to invert multiplication, but in situations where this is not possible, we often attempt to construct an adjoint instead: the ideal quotient is adjoint to the multiplication by ring ideals, and the implication in propositional logic is adjoint to logical conjunction.

Category theory
 Equivalences. If F : D → C is an equivalence of categories, then we have an inverse equivalence G : C → D, and the two functors F and G form an adjoint pair. The unit and counit are natural isomorphisms in this case.
 A series of adjunctions. The functor π0 which assigns to a category its set of connected components is left-adjoint to the functor D which assigns to a set the discrete category on that set.  Moreover, D is left-adjoint to the object functor U which assigns to each category its set of objects, and finally U is left-adjoint to A which assigns to each set the indiscrete category on that set.
 Exponential object. In a cartesian closed category the endofunctor C → C given by –×A has a right adjoint –A. This pair is often referred to as currying and uncurrying; in many special cases, they are also continuous and form a homeomorphism.

Categorical logic
 Quantification. If  is a unary predicate expressing some property, then a sufficiently strong set theory may prove the existence of the set  of terms that fulfill the property. A proper subset  and the associated injection of  into  is characterized by a predicate  expressing a strictly more restrictive property. 
The role of quantifiers in predicate logics is in forming propositions and also in expressing sophisticated predicates by closing formulas with possibly more variables. Using a quantifier to close , we can form the set

Set theoretic operations like the intersection  of two sets directly corresponds to the conjunction  of predicates. In categorical logic, a subfield of topos theory, quantifiers are identified with adjoints to the pullback functor. Such a realization can be seen in analogy to the discussion of propositional logic using set theory but the general definition make for a richer range of logics.

So consider an object  in a category with pullbacks. Any morphism  induces a functor 
 
on the category that is the preorder of  subobjects.

 Example: In , the category of sets and functions, the canonical subobjects are the subset (or rather their canonical injections). It therefore turns out to be (in bijection with) the inverse image .
For , let us figure out the left adjoint, which is defined via

which here just means
.

Consider . We see . Conversely, If for an  we also have , then clearly . So  implies . We conclude that left adjoint to the inverse image functor  is given by the direct image. Here is a characterization of this result, which matches more the logical interpretation: The image of  under  is the full set of 's, such that  is non-empty. So

Put this in analogy to our motivation .
The right adjoint to the inverse image functor is given (without doing the computation here) by

See also powerset.

Probability 
The twin fact in probability can be understood as an adjunction: that expectation commutes with affine transform, and that the expectation is in some sense the best solution to the problem of finding a real-valued approximation to a distribution on the real numbers.

That is, for any affine function  and any real number , define a morphism .

That is, for any affine function  and any , define a morphism .

Then, the Dirac delta measure defines a functor: , and the expectation defines another functor , and they are adjoint: .

Adjunctions in full

There are hence numerous functors and natural transformations associated with every adjunction, and only a small portion is sufficient to determine the rest.

An adjunction between categories C and D consists of
A functor F : D → C called the left adjoint
A functor G : C → D called the right adjoint
A natural isomorphism Φ : homC(F–,–) → homD(–,G–)
A natural transformation ε : FG → 1C called the counit
A natural transformation η : 1D → GF called the unit

An equivalent formulation, where X denotes any object of C and Y denotes any object of D, is as follows:

For every C-morphism f : FY → X, there is a unique D-morphism ΦY, X(f) = g : Y → GX such that the diagrams below commute, and for every D-morphism g : Y → GX, there is a unique C-morphism Φ−1Y, X(g) = f : FY → X in C such that the diagrams below commute:

From this assertion, one can recover that:
The transformations ε, η, and Φ are related by the equations

The transformations ε, η satisfy the counit–unit equations

Each pair (GX, εX) is a terminal morphism from F to X in C
Each pair (FY, ηY) is an initial morphism from Y to G in D

In particular, the equations above allow one to define Φ, ε, and η in terms of any one of the three. However, the adjoint functors F and G alone are in general not sufficient to determine the adjunction. The equivalence of these situations is demonstrated below.

Universal morphisms induce hom-set adjunction

Given a right adjoint functor G : C → D; in the sense of initial morphisms, one may construct the induced hom-set adjunction by doing the following steps.

 Construct a functor F : D → C and a natural transformation η.
 For each object Y in D, choose an initial morphism (F(Y), ηY) from Y to G, so that ηY : Y → G(F(Y)). We have the map of F on objects and the family of morphisms η.
 For each f : Y0 → Y1, as (F(Y0), ηY0) is an initial morphism, then factorize ηY1 o f with ηY0 and get F(f) : F(Y0) → F(Y1). This is the map of F on morphisms.
 The commuting diagram of that factorization implies the commuting diagram of natural transformations, so η : 1D → G o F is a natural transformation.
 Uniqueness of that factorization and that G is a functor implies that the map of F on morphisms preserves compositions and identities.
 Construct a natural isomorphism Φ : homC(F-,-) → homD(-,G-).
 For each object X in C, each object Y in D, as (F(Y), ηY) is an initial morphism, then ΦY, X is a bijection, where ΦY, X(f : F(Y) → X) = G(f) o ηY.
 η is a natural transformation, G is a functor, then for any objects X0, X1 in C, any objects Y0, Y1 in D, any x : X0 → X1, any y : Y1 → Y0, we have ΦY1, X1(x o f o F(y)) = G(x) o G(f) o G(F(y)) o ηY1 = G(x) o G(f) o ηY0 o y = G(x) o ΦY0, X0(f) o y, and then Φ is natural in both arguments.

A similar argument allows one to construct a hom-set adjunction from the terminal morphisms to a left adjoint functor.  (The construction that starts with a right adjoint is slightly more common, since the right adjoint in many adjoint pairs is a trivially defined inclusion or forgetful functor.)

counit–unit adjunction induces hom-set adjunction

Given functors F : D → C, G : C → D, and a counit–unit adjunction (ε, η) : F  G, we can construct a hom-set adjunction by finding the natural transformation Φ : homC(F-,-) → homD(-,G-) in the following steps:

For each f : FY → X and each g : Y → GX, define

The transformations Φ and Ψ are natural because η and ε are natural.

Using, in order, that F is a functor, that ε is natural, and the counit–unit equation 1FY = εFY o F(ηY), we obtain

hence ΨΦ is the identity transformation.

Dually, using that G is a functor, that η is natural, and the counit–unit equation 1GX = G(εX) o ηGX, we obtain

hence ΦΨ is the identity transformation. Thus Φ is a natural isomorphism with inverse Φ−1 = Ψ.

Hom-set adjunction induces all of the above

Given functors F : D → C, G : C → D, and a hom-set adjunction Φ : homC(F-,-) → homD(-,G-), one can construct a counit–unit adjunction

 ,

which defines families of initial and terminal morphisms, in the following steps:

Let    for each X in C, where    is the identity morphism.
Let    for each Y in D, where    is the identity morphism.
The bijectivity and naturality of Φ imply that each (GX, εX) is a terminal morphism from F to X in C, and each (FY, ηY) is an initial morphism from Y to G in D.
The naturality of Φ implies the naturality of ε and η, and the two formulas

for each f: FY → X and g: Y → GX (which completely determine Φ).

Substituting FY for X and ηY = ΦY, FY(1FY) for g in the second formula gives the first counit–unit equation
,
and substituting GX for Y and εX = Φ−1GX, X(1GX) for f in the first formula gives the second counit–unit equation
.

Properties

Existence

Not every functor G : C → D admits a left adjoint. If C is a complete category, then the functors with left adjoints can be characterized by the adjoint functor theorem of Peter J. Freyd: G has a left adjoint if and only if it is continuous and a certain smallness condition is satisfied: for every object Y of D there exists a family of morphisms

fi : Y → G(Xi)

where the indices i come from a set , not a proper class, such that every morphism

h : Y → G(X)

can be written as

h = G(t) ∘ fi

t : Xi → X ∈ C.

An analogous statement characterizes those functors with a right adjoint.

An important special case is that of locally presentable categories. If  is a functor between locally presentable categories, then

 F has a right adjoint if and only if F preserves small colimits
 F has a left adjoint if and only if F preserves small limits and is an accessible functor

Uniqueness

If the functor F : D → C has two right adjoints G and G′, then G and G′ are naturally isomorphic. The same is true for left adjoints.

Conversely, if F is left adjoint to G, and G is naturally isomorphic to G′ then F is also left adjoint to G′. More generally, if 〈F, G, ε, η〉 is an adjunction (with counit–unit (ε,η)) and
σ : F → F′
τ : G → G′
are natural isomorphisms then 〈F′, G′, ε′, η′〉 is an adjunction where

Here  denotes vertical composition of natural transformations, and  denotes horizontal composition.

Composition

Adjunctions can be composed in a natural fashion. Specifically, if 〈F, G, ε, η〉 is an adjunction between C and D and 〈F′, G′, ε′, η′〉 is an adjunction between D and E then the functor

is left adjoint to

More precisely, there is an adjunction between F F and G' G with unit and counit given respectively by the compositions:

This new adjunction is called the composition''' of the two given adjunctions.

Since there is also a natural way to define an identity adjunction between a category C and itself, one can then form a category whose objects are all small categories and whose morphisms are adjunctions.

Limit preservation

The most important property of adjoints is their continuity: every functor that has a left adjoint (and therefore is a right adjoint) is continuous (i.e. commutes with limits in the category theoretical sense); every functor that has a right adjoint (and therefore is a left adjoint) is cocontinuous (i.e. commutes with colimits).

Since many common constructions in mathematics are limits or colimits, this provides a wealth of information. For example:
 applying a right adjoint functor to a product of objects yields the product of the images;
 applying a left adjoint functor to a coproduct of objects yields the coproduct of the images;
 every right adjoint functor between two abelian categories is left exact;
 every left adjoint functor between two abelian categories is right exact.

Additivity

If C and D are preadditive categories and F : D → C is an additive functor with a right adjoint G : C → D, then G is also an additive functor and the hom-set bijections

are, in fact, isomorphisms of abelian groups. Dually, if G is additive with a left adjoint F, then F is also additive.

Moreover, if both C and D are additive categories (i.e. preadditive categories with all finite biproducts), then any pair of adjoint functors between them are automatically additive.

Relationships

Universal constructions

As stated earlier, an adjunction between categories C and D gives rise to a family of universal morphisms, one for each object in C and one for each object in D. Conversely, if there exists a universal morphism to a functor G : C → D from every object of D, then G has a left adjoint.

However, universal constructions are more general than adjoint functors: a universal construction is like an optimization problem; it gives rise to an adjoint pair if and only if this problem has a solution for every object of D (equivalently, every object of C).

Equivalences of categories

If a functor F : D → C is one half of an equivalence of categories then it is the left adjoint in an adjoint equivalence of categories, i.e. an adjunction whose unit and counit are isomorphisms.

Every adjunction 〈F, G, ε, η〉 extends an equivalence of certain subcategories. Define C1 as the full subcategory of C consisting of those objects X of C for which εX is an isomorphism, and define D1 as the full subcategory of D consisting of those objects Y of D for which ηY is an isomorphism. Then F and G can be restricted to D1 and C1 and yield inverse equivalences of these subcategories.

In a sense, then, adjoints are "generalized" inverses. Note however that a right inverse of F (i.e. a functor G such that FG is naturally isomorphic to 1D) need not be a right (or left) adjoint of F. Adjoints generalize two-sided inverses.

Monads

Every adjunction 〈F, G, ε, η〉 gives rise to an associated monad 〈T, η, μ〉 in the category D. The functor

is given by T = GF. The unit of the monad

is just the unit η of the adjunction and the multiplication transformation

is given by μ = GεF. Dually, the triple 〈FG, ε, FηG〉 defines a comonad in C''.

Every monad arises from some adjunction—in fact, typically from many adjunctions—in the above fashion. Two constructions, called the category of Eilenberg–Moore algebras and the Kleisli category are two extremal solutions to the problem of constructing an adjunction that gives rise to a given monad.

Notes

References

External links
 – seven short lectures on adjunctions by Eugenia Cheng of The Catsters
 WildCats is a category theory package for Mathematica. Manipulation and visualization of objects, morphisms, categories, functors, natural transformations, universal properties.